Werdohl station is the passenger station of the town of Werdohl in the German state of North Rhine-Westphalia. It lies on the Ruhr–Sieg railway, running from Hagen to Siegen and was opened in 1861 with the commissioning of the line. From 1887 to 1955 Werdohl was also the terminus of a narrow-gauge railway line to Lüdenscheid operated by the Altena District Railway (Kreis Altenaer Eisenbahn).

Since the end of December 2012 Werdohl station is also a stop on the Sauerland-Höhenflug hiking trail.

Remodeling of the station building 

A neo-baroque entrance building with two storeys was built in 1914. It is now a monument on the Märkische Straße Technischer Kulturdenkmäler (“Märkische technical heritage road”). Since July 2011, the station has been extensively renovated by the Werdohl municipality. The renovation is expected to cost a total of around €2.3 million. In addition, the main entrance is currently being modified to provide barrier-free access.

Rail services 

Werdohl station is currently served by a Regionalbahn service and a Regional-Express:

Bus services 

Bus services run from the station forecourt to the town of Werdohl and to Altena, Lüdenscheid, Neuenrade and Plettenberg:

Notes

External links 

Railway stations in North Rhine-Westphalia
Railway stations in Germany opened in 1861
1861 establishments in Prussia